This is a list of tallest freestanding steel structures in the world past and present. To be a freestanding steel structure it must not be supported by guy wires, the list therefore does not include guyed masts and the main vertical and lateral structural elements and floor systems in the case of buildings, are constructed from steel. This type of construction is a rarity today as most tall buildings are built with a composite structure featuring a reinforced concrete core.

Oil platforms built using rigid steel jackets, such as the Bullwinkle (oil platform), are included and ranked as the local medium(water) does not provide any horizontal support. In fact they are over engineered specifically to resist water forces them rather than modulate them as compliant towers are designed to do.

Demolished structures and structures under construction are also included but not ranked.

Steel Structures (above 275 m / 900 ft in height)
 indicates a structures no longer standing.
 indicates a structure built in water.

 For all structures the pinnacle height is given meaning it includes both spires and antennas as long as they are built of steel.

See also 
 List of tallest buildings
 List of tallest towers
 List of tallest freestanding structures
 List of tallest buildings and structures
 List of tallest structures by country
 List of tallest oil platforms
 Lattice tower

References 

Tallest, freestanding